Savage Souls is a 2001 French costume drama film directed by Chilean filmmaker Raúl Ruiz. It is based on the 1949 novel Les Âmes fortes by Jean Giono. It was screened out of competition at the 2001 Cannes Film Festival.

Cast
 Laetitia Casta as Thérèse
 Frédéric Diefenthal as Firmin
 Arielle Dombasle as Madame Numance
 John Malkovich as Monsieur Numance
 Charles Berling as Reveillard
 Johan Leysen as Rampal
 Édith Scob as Première femme veillée
 Christian Vadim as Le pasteur
 Carlos Lopez as Le muet
 Monique Mélinand as Thérèse âgée
 Jacqueline Staup as Deuxième femme veillée
 Corine Blue as Jeune femme veillée
 Aimé Lebedel as Vieux chanteur
 Nathalie Boutefeu as Charlotte
 Marc Dantes as Forgerons

References

External links

2001 films
2001 drama films
2000s French-language films
French drama films
Films based on works by Jean Giono
Films directed by Raúl Ruiz
2000s French films